is a retired Olympic champion Japanese judoka who competed in the middleweight (-80 kg) division.

Biography
Sonoda was born in Yanagawa, Fukuoka, Japan. He attended the Fukuoka Institute of Technology, and won a gold medal at the 1969 World Judo Championships along with his older brother, Yoshio, who won the gold medal in the lightweight (-63 kg) division. After graduating, he began work at the Maruzen Oil Company (current Cosmo Oil Company), where he continued to practice judo. He joined the Fukuoka prefectural police force in July 1972, at the invitation of the police force's judo instructor. Sonoda had competed in the All-Japan Judo Championships 10 times from age 19, but Shozo Fujii had won the competition for three consecutive years prior to 1976, when the championship served as the qualifier for the 1976 Summer Olympics, and was seen as a lock for Japan's Olympic judo team. However, Sonoda defeated Fujii by a very close decision, gained his first appearance at the Olympics at age 29. He defeated Valeriy Dvoinikov of the Soviet Union by koka from an Osoto Gari in the finals to capture the gold medal.

Sonoda retired after competing in the 1978 Jigoro Kano Cup along with Kazuhiro Ninomiya. He and Ninomiya were rivals and friends for over 30 years, having been born on the same year, entered the same police force, competed in the same World Championships and Olympics, and having retired at the same time. He worked as a judo instructor for the Fukuoka prefectural police, and one of his pupils, Kie Kusakabe, appeared in the 2000 and 2004 Summer Olympics.

See also
 List of judoka
 List of Olympic medalists in judo

References

External links
 

1946 births
Living people
Japanese male judoka
Judoka at the 1976 Summer Olympics
Olympic judoka of Japan
Olympic gold medalists for Japan
People from Yanagawa, Fukuoka
Sportspeople from Fukuoka Prefecture
Olympic medalists in judo
Medalists at the 1976 Summer Olympics
Universiade medalists in judo
Universiade gold medalists for Japan
Medalists at the 1967 Summer Universiade
Fukuoka Institute of Technology alumni